This is a list of Honorary Fellows of Queens' College, Cambridge.

 Philip Allen, Baron Allen of Abbeydale
 Sir Arthur Armitage
 Andrew Bailey
 Sir Harold Bailey
 Sir John Banham
 Henry Bovey
 Sir Derek Bowett
 Sir Stephen Brown
 Sir Reader Bullard
 Henry Chadwick
 Sir Robert Chote
 Frederic Chase
 Sir Humphrey Cripps
 Sir Andrew Crockett
 Edward Cullinan
 Kenneth Dadzie
 Sir Richard Dearlove
 Joost de Blank
 John Eatwell, Baron Eatwell
 Abba Eban
 Mohamed A. El-Erian
 Charles Falconer, Baron Falconer of Thoroton
 Michael Foale
 Stephen Fry
 Sir Frederick Gentle
 Mike Gibson
 M. S. Gill
 Paul Ginsborg
 Paul Greengrass
 Thomas Hannay
 Sir Martin Harris
 Demis Hassabis
 Robert Haszeldine
 Richard Hickox
 Mairi Hurrell
 Awn Al-Khasawneh
 Dr Amma Kyei-Mensah MB
 Herbert Loewe
 Emily Maitlis
 Peter Mathias
 Ronald Oxburgh, Baron Oxburgh
 Sir Thomas Padmore
 Dame Alison Peacock
 Sir William Peel
 John Polkinghorne
 Sir Samuel Provis
 Osborne Reynolds
 Herbert Edward Ryle
 Mark Santer
 Professor Naomi Segal
 Bernardo Sepulveda Amor
 Dr Yoshiyasu Shirai
 Sidney Smith
 Edward James Stone
 Sir Morris Sugden
 Graham Swift
 Hugh Thomas, Baron Thomas of Swynnerton
 Sir Shenton Thomas
 Robert John Tillyard
 Charles Tomlinson
 Dr Pippa Wells
 Sir David Walker

Fellows of Queens' College, Cambridge
Queens' College, Cambridge
Queens' College